Reeves Mound may refer to:

Reeves Mound (Alfred, Ohio), listed on the NRHP in Ohio
Reeves Mound (Stringtown, Kentucky), listed on the NRHP in Kentucky